Gloria Castillo (March 3, 1933 – October 24, 1978) was an American stage and motion picture actress of the 1950s and a businesswoman.

Early years 
Castillo was born in Belen, New Mexico. She was the daughter of Mr. and Mrs. R.C. Castillo, and she graduated from Belen High School. Her first acting experience came in a production of The Man Who Came to Dinner in high school. She graduated from the University of New Mexico in June 1954, majoring in music, drama, and education. She appeared in a production of the play Late Love in July 1954 at the Little Theater in Albuquerque, New Mexico  and later at the Pasadena Playhouse in Pasadena, California.

Television 
Castillo was signed by MGM production manager Harry Joe Brown in 1954. She first appeared on television on the General Electric Theater (1954) and in an episode of I'm A Fool (1954). Later she was in episodes of Disneyland (1959), The Millionaire (1959), Zorro (1959), and Bat Masterson (1960).

Film 
Castillo's first movie roles were in 1955 in The Night of the Hunter and The Vanishing American. Most frequently Castillo can be seen in sci-fi and B-movie films made in the late 1950s. Some of the titles in which she appears are Invasion of the Saucer Men (1957), Reform School Girl (1957) and Teenage Monster (1958).

Clothing business
In the 1960s, Castillo and her husband began Chessa Davis, a women's clothing company. Skirts designed by her were featured in fashion magazines and sold in department stores.

Personal life 
Castillo married Hollywood writer, producer, and director Ellis Kadison. Her brother is actor Leo Castillo, who achieved fame under the name of Leo Carrillo. Her second child is singer-songwriter Joshua Kadison.

Death 
Castillo died on October 24, 1978, at the age of 45, from oropharyngeal cancer. Joshua Kadison's song "Mama's Arms," which appears on his debut album Painted Desert Serenade, was inspired by his late mother.

Films 
 The Night of the Hunter (1955) - Ruby
 The Vanishing American (1955) - Yashi
 Runaway Daughters (1956) - Angela Forrest
 Invasion of the Saucer Men (1957) - Joan Hayden
 Reform School Girl (1957) - Donna Price
 Teenage Monster (1958) - Kathy North
 The Light in the Forest (1958) - Regina (uncredited)
 You've Got to Be Smart (1967) - Connie Jackson (final film role)

References

Albuquerque Tribune, "Gloria Castillo Lauded For Pasadena Play Role", July 23, 1954, page 1.
Albuquerque Tribune, "Castillos Arrive For Yule Holiday", December 24, 1958, page 11.

External links

1935 births
1978 deaths
20th-century American actresses
20th-century American singers
Actresses from Albuquerque, New Mexico
Actresses from Los Angeles
Actresses from New Mexico
American film actresses
American stage actresses
American television actresses
Belen High School alumni
People from Belen, New Mexico
University of New Mexico alumni
Deaths from cancer in California